Susan Allix (b. 1934) is a British typesetter, bookbinder, and book artist. She attended the Royal College of Art (RCA). She established the Willow Press to publish her book art.

Her work is in the U.K. Government Art Collection, the Yale Center for British Art, the Smithsonian Libraries, and the National Museum of Women in the Arts.

References

External links
  

1943 births
Living people
Women book artists
Book artists
20th-century British women artists